Lenard is a surname. Notable people with the name include:

Aldon Lewis Lenard (1921-2007), Canadian sports person 
Alexander Lenard (1910-1972), Hungarian physician, writer, and translator
Henry M. Lenard (1903-1983), American politician
Mark Lenard (1924-1996), American actor
Philipp Lenard (1862-1947), Hungarian-German physicist and winner of the Nobel Prize for Physics, 1905
Voshon Lenard (born 1973), American basketball player

See also
Leonard, given name and surname

fr:Lenard